Girenbad is a village in the municipality Hinwil in the Canton of Zürich, Switzerland.

References

External links 
Official website of the municipality Hinwil 

Villages in the canton of Zürich